Black Girl is an American family drama film with a screenplay by J.E. Franklin, based on her 1969 play, and directed by Ossie Davis. The film explores issues and experiences of black womanhood in the 1970s, including how black women were depicted and common stereotypes of the period. According to Melvin Donalson in Black Directors in Hollywood, "Black Girl is a film that explores the intricate and sometimes painful connections between mothers and daughters."

Plot
Billie Jean, the youngest of three half-sisters, lives with her mother Mama Rosie and grandmother M'Dear. She desperately wishes to avoid the fate of her two sisters Norma Faye and Ruth Ann, neither of whom finished high school and are now trapped in dull marriages. Billie Jean dreams of becoming a successful dancer, but her mother and sisters belittle her attempts to improve herself.

Mama Rosie compares her daughters unfavorably with the more ambitious Netta, a young lady from the neighborhood. When Netta comes home from college to visit Mama Rosie for Mother's Day, Norma Faye and Ruth Ann resent their mother's doting on her. The sisters try to trick Billie Jean into believing Netta will move in and take her room once she graduates. Netta does her best to rise above their insults and makes plans for Billie Jean to finish high school and to apply for college at the end of the school term.

Mama Rosie's ex-husband Earl returns to town to visit the family with hopes to rekindle a relationship with Mama Rosie. He suggests Billie can make it by dancing in a bar in Detroit. M'Dear's live-in boyfriend Herbert objects to the disrespectful conversation and vulgar language. Mama Rose says that everyone present is grown and married except Billie. Earl and Mama Rosie visit a nearby neighborhood park, where they remember their days of youth and discuss their bittersweet past. Earl suggests Rosie come with him to Detroit, where he owns a shoe business, but Rosie rejects his offer and they part company. Back at home, Rosie and her mother discuss the old wounds which Earl's visit has resurrected.

The elder sisters gang up on Billie Jean, holding her down, insisting Billie Jean needs to be put into reform school as they fail to understand and respect Billie's goals. M'Dear reminds Rosie of her past dreams and asks Rosie to allow Billie to fulfill her own dreams without interference. The film ends with Billie Jean leaving home to attend college despite protests from her envious sisters.

Cast

Production
In 1971 Franklin worked on a feature-film adaptation of her play, Black Girl, for a very small advance. The experience of making and marketing the film was an unhappy one for Franklin. Although the producer, Lee Savin, promised that Woodie King Jr. would be involved in the project, King was dropped. She urged the director to hire Shauneille Perry as an assistant, but he did not. While she managed to get them to hire Peggy Pettit, rather than "a light-bright-damned-near-white actress", to play Billie Jean, against her wishes they cast Claudia McNeil, who had been in the 1961 film A Raisin in the Sun, as Mu'Dear. Scenes were re-written and re-arranged by the director, and her voiceover to cover up a "ridiculous" scene between Mu'Dear and Mr. Herbert was never recorded. Even more egregiously, "Efforts were made early in the filming to exploit material for sex and violence," she said. Franklin tried to have a scene where the young female character of Billie Jean disrobes in front of the camera removed; it stayed in the film, albeit without nudity. The poster for the film "showed a blow-up of Norma Faye's face, teeth snarling in mad-dog fashion, threatening Billie Jean with a knife. A moment which had lasted only five seconds had been lifted from the film to represent the supposed essence of the entire play.... This was blatant misrepresentation." After Franklin threatened to register her disapproval at every newspaper or television interview and speaking engagement, "In the next few days the illustration appeared without the knife. I thought that was the end of the matter; but a week later later the knife was back." Finally, "voice-overs had been used to erase all "fucks" to make the film eligible for a PG rating. ... I was urged not to mention to anyone that these cuts had been made, as people might think that they had missed something." The film was released in 1972. It had its world premiere at the Strand Theatre (Manhattan), then known as the Penthouse Theater on Broadway, to benefit sickle cell anemia.

Feminism
Davis was not afraid to focus on realistic and sometimes uncomfortable issues. A central theme of his was the depiction of black women in that period. Black Girl was released "against the backdrop of the surging feminist movement in the early 1970s".

Davis explores the women's liberation movement that occurred contemporaneous to the  Black Power movement through the characters' stories, especially that of Mama Rosie as a single black mother struggling to support her family while refusing to allow her ex-husband to save her. "Davis gave notice that working-class black women—who were not prostitutes, drug users, or gun-toting heroines—had stories to tell that were provocative and relevant."

The role of black women in films was changing. "The role of black women in films, always previously confined to servant roles, with only white-looking women being allowed to be sexually alluring (and sinful), did not reflect their status in the black community."

Blaxploitation
Blaxploitation films in the 1970s exploited the stereotypes of African Americans in the roles they played. The genre promoted popular images of black men and women using traits of extraordinary cool, sexuality, and violence. Black Girl embraces some of these traits, in depicting the sexuality of the older sisters, and in a violent scene where the oldest sister pulls a knife on Netta, the foster sister. Roger Ebert stated that in Black Girl "we see a black family with more depth and complexity than the movies usually permit"

Reception
Melvin Donalson wrote: "Studios were perhaps unenthusiastic about marketing a film that explored emotional and psychological dimensions of black womanhood, and perhaps audiences were still hungry for the trendy black urban action films that dominated the period." Roger Ebert of the Chicago Sun-Times rated it three out of four stars and wrote, "Black Girl is a movie so filled with things it wants to say that sometimes the messages are lost in a confusion of storylines. A more disciplined movie might have been made by eliminating some of the material and organizing the rest, but I'm not sure it would have been a better movie or a more moving experience."  Roger Greenspun of The New York Times described it as "a poor movie that makes it look as if there never had been a good play" and said that "I suspect that the real difference between the successful play and the failed movie lies in Ossie Davis's direction, which ranges from pedestrian to downright helpless."  Variety quoted their review, which called it "the best study of Negro family life since Lorraine Hansberry's A Raisin in the Sun".

See also
 List of American films of 1972

References

 
 New York Times Movie Review by Roger Greenspun

External links
 
 
 
 

1972 films
1972 drama films
Blaxploitation films
American films based on plays
Films directed by Ossie Davis
Films scored by Ed Bogas
African-American drama films
Cinerama Releasing Corporation films
1970s English-language films
1970s American films